Andre Agassi defeated Marc Rosset in the final, 6–3, 6–3, 4–6, 7–5 to win the singles tennis title at the 1994 Paris Open.

Goran Ivanišević was the defending champion, but lost in the quarterfinals to Michael Chang.

Seeds
A champion seed is indicated in bold text while text in italics indicates the round in which that seed was eliminated.

  Pete Sampras (quarterfinals)
  Goran Ivanišević (quarterfinals)
  Michael Stich (second round)
  Sergi Bruguera (semifinals)
  Stefan Edberg (second round)
  Boris Becker (quarterfinals)
  Michael Chang (semifinals)
  Andre Agassi (champion)
  Todd Martin (third round)
  Wayne Ferreira (second round)
  Andriy Medvedev (second round)
  Yevgeny Kafelnikov (third round)
  Jim Courier (second round)
  Marc Rosset (final)
  Thomas Muster (second round)
  Richard Krajicek (third round)

Draw

 NB: The Final was the best of 5 sets.

Finals

Top half

Section 1

Section 2

Bottom half

Section 3

Section 4

External links
 1994 Paris Open draw

Singles